Connangles is a commune in the Haute-Loire department in south-central France.

Geography
The Senouire forms most of the commune's northeastern border, then flows southwest through its southeastern part.

Population

See also
Communes of the Haute-Loire department

References

Communes of Haute-Loire